"Pretty Penny" is a 1995 promo single from Stone Temple Pilots' 1994 album Purple.  It differs greatly in style from the rest of the songs on the album, and serves as a calm, old-fashioned interlude between the distorted and delirious "Still Remains" and the aggressive, sinister "Silvergun Superman".

According to lead vocalist Scott Weiland, this song was his last desperate attempt to prove to himself that he was not a drug addict.  His drug addiction later became a huge problem for the band and led to two hiatuses and, ultimately, his death.

Weiland stated the following in a RIP magazine interview in 1994:

In 2013 without Weiland, the song was performed again by the three remaining members of the band with their new lead vocalist Chester Bennington of Linkin Park and Dead by Sunrise. The song can be heard on KROQ, and a video of their performance at a different location to where it's played can be seen on YouTube, which was uploaded by its user.

Charts

References 

1994 songs
1995 singles
Stone Temple Pilots songs
Songs written by Dean DeLeo
Songs written by Scott Weiland
Song recordings produced by Brendan O'Brien (record producer)
Folk rock songs